The 1979 New South Wales Open, also known by its sponsored name Nabisco New South Wales Open, was a combined men's and women's tennis tournament played on outdoor grass courts at the White City Stadium in Sydney. The men's event was part of the 1979 Colgate-Palmolive Grand Prix circuit while the women's event was part of the 1979 Colgate Series. It was the 87th edition of the event and was held from 17 December through 23 December 1979. The singles titles were won by 14th-seeded Phil Dent and third-seeded Hana Mandlíková.

Finals

Men's singles
 Phil Dent defeated  Hank Pfister 6–4, 6–4, 7–5

Women's singles
 Hana Mandlíková defeated  Bettina Bunge 6–3, 3–6, 6–3

Men's doubles
 Peter McNamara /  Paul McNamee defeated  Steve Docherty /  Christopher Lewis 7–6, 6–3

Women's doubles
 Diane Desfor /  Barbara Hallquist defeated  Barbara Jordan /  Kym Ruddell 4–6, 6–2, 6–2

References

External links
 
 Association of Tennis Professionals (ATP) tournament profile
 Women's Tennis Association (WTA) tournament profile
 International Tennis Federation (ITF) men's tournament edition details

1979
1979 in Australian tennis
December 1979 sports events in Australia
1979 New South Wales Open